KV38 is an ancient Egyptian tomb located in the Valley of the Kings in Egypt. It was used for the reburial of Pharaoh Thutmose I of the Eighteenth Dynasty, and was where his body was removed to (from KV20) by Thutmose III.

External links
Theban Mapping Project: KV38 includes detailed maps of most of the tombs.

1899 archaeological discoveries
Buildings and structures completed in the 15th century BC
Valley of the Kings
Thutmose I